Joel Beinin (born 1948) is Donald J. McLachlan Professor of History and professor of Middle East history at Stanford University.  From 2006 to 2008 he served as director of Middle East studies and professor of history at the American University in Cairo.

Education

Beinin was raised as a Zionist in an American Jewish family. On graduating from high school, he spent six months working on a kibbutz, where he met his future wife. He studied Arabic at university, and  received his B.A.  from Princeton University in 1970. He spent the summer of 1969 studying Arabic at the American University in Cairo. Intending to move to Israel permanently, he joined other members of Hashomer Hatzair in living and working at Kibbutz Lahav. There, on encountering attitudes that struck him as being contemptuous of Palestinians, he gradually became disenchanted with his early ideals. He returned to the United States in 1973, and took his M.A. from Harvard University in 1974, and, after working in  auto plants in Detroit, obtained his A.M.L.S. and Ph.D. from the University of Michigan in 1978 and 1982, respectively. He has also studied at the Hebrew University of Jerusalem.

Research and career 

Beinin's research and writing focuses on workers, peasants, and minorities in the modern Middle East. Though initially interested in the rise of an Arab Working class in Mandatory Palestine, under his thesis supervisor's advice, he changed the topic of his doctoral thesis to a history of the Egyptian labor movement since 1936. That Ph.D. thesis was combined with one covering an earlier period of Egyptian labor history by his friend and colleague Zachary Lockman and resulted in the publication of Workers on the Nile: Nationalism, Communism, Islam and the Egyptian Working Class, 1882–1954 (1989). Among his later work is a study of the Jewish communities of modern Egypt which led to his major historical study, The Dispersion Of Egyptian Jewry: Culture, Politics, And The Formation Of A Modern Diaspora (1998), which examines the diversity of Egyptian Jewish identities in Egypt and in the diaspora. He has engaged in fieldwork to collect oral reports among many Egyptian Jewish communities dispersed throughout the world after the Suez War of 1956, among them the Karaites of San Francisco.

In 2002 he served as president of the Middle East Studies Association of North America. He served as director of graduate studies in the history department at Stanford University in 2002–2004 and again in 2005–06, but then took a leave of absence from that institution in order to take up a position as director of Middle East studies at the American University in Cairo. At the time he said that Stanford was institutionally uninterested in the study and teaching of the modern Middle East.

Beinin has written four books and co-edited three others and published many scholarly articles.

He is also active as a commentator on issues regarding Israel, Palestine, and the Arab–Israeli conflict. He has been a contributing editor to Middle East Report and has published articles in, among others, The Nation and Le Monde diplomatique. He is a member of Academia for Equality, an organization working to promote democratization, equality and access to higher education for all communities living in Israel.

In 2006 Beinin sued conservative writer David Horowitz for copyright infringement after Horowitz used Beinin's image on the cover of a booklet entitled "Campus Support for Terrorism." In 2008, the case ended in an out of court settlement in which Horowitz donated $27,500 to charity but admitted no liability.

Bibliography, books (partial) 
Beinin, Joel; Lockman, Zachary: Workers on the Nile: Nationalism, Communism, Islam, and the Egyptian Working Class, 1882–1954,  Princeton Univ Pr, U.S.A., 1989, 
Lockman Zachary and Beinin Joel (ed): Intifada The Palestinian Uprising, South End Press, U.S.A., 1989  
Beinin, Joel:  Was the Red Flag Flying There?: Marxist Politics and the Arab-Israeli Conflict in Egypt and Israel, 1948–1965,  Univ of California 1990 
Beinin, Joel: Origins of the Gulf War. Westfield: Open Magazine, 1991
Joel Beinin, Joe Stork (ed.): Political Islam : Essays from Middle East Report (Merip Reader),  University of California Press, 1996, 
Beinin, Joel: Workers and Peasants in the Modern Middle East, (The Contemporary Middle East)  Cambridge University Press, 2001, 
Rejwan, Nissim/ Beinin, Joel (FRW): The Last Jews in Baghdad: Remembering a Lost Homeland, University of Texas Press, 2004,  
Beinin, Joel: The Dispersion Of Egyptian Jewry Culture, Politics, And The Formation Of A Modern Diaspora Berkeley:   University of California Press,   c1998.   Amer Univ in Cairo Pr, 2005,  
Beinin, Joel and Rebecca L Stein: The Struggle for Sovereignty: Palestine And Israel, 1993–2005, (Stanford Studies in Middle Eastern and Islamic Societies and Cultures)  Stanford Univ Pr, 2006,

References

External links 
 Joel Beinin's web page at Stanford University
 "War Leads To Suit: Beinin Sues Horowitz" on Scholars for Peace in the Middle East
 Video:  Joel Beinin - United States Foreign Policy and the Palestine-Israel Conflict (August 17, 2007), interview.
2006 radio interview with Dr. Joel Beinin
 A Professor Is Criticized for Saying the U.S. Should Bring Bin Laden Before An International Tribunal Instead of Bombing Afghanistan: A Debate On the Role of the University in Wartime A radio interview on Democracy Now! November 26, 2001

Princeton University alumni
Harvard University alumni
University of Michigan School of Information alumni
Historians of the Middle East
Writers on the Middle East
Scholars of antisemitism
Jewish American historians
American male non-fiction writers
Islam and politics
Middle Eastern studies in the United States
Stanford University Department of History faculty
Academic staff of The American University in Cairo
Living people
Place of birth missing (living people)
American expatriates in Egypt
21st-century American historians
21st-century American male writers
21st-century American Jews
1948 births